Christopher Connelly (September 8, 1941 – December 7, 1988) was an American actor, best known for his role as Norman Harrington in the successful prime time ABC soap opera Peyton Place. He stayed with the series during its entire five-year run, from 1964 to 1969.

Early life
Connelly graduated from Missouri Military Academy in Mexico, Missouri.

Career

In addition to his aforementioned series-long run on ABC's Peyton Place, Connelly guest-starred in 1973 on Lorne Greene's short-lived ABC crime drama Griff, and in 1974, he starred in the television series Paper Moon, with a young Jodie Foster playing his daughter. The series was based on the film of the same name but was cancelled after only a few months. The film version starred Connelly's former Peyton Place costar Ryan O'Neal — who had played Connelly's brother in the serial — and O'Neal's daughter Tatum O'Neal.

In 1964, he appeared as “Trainey”, a reform school kid in the episode “The Warden” on Gunsmoke with George Kennedy. In 1977, Connelly portrayed Kit Carson in the episode "Kit Carson and the Mountain Man" of NBC's Walt Disney's Wonderful World of Color. Gregg Palmer portrayed Jim Bridger in the two-part segment, and Robert Reed played John C. Frémont. Gary Lockwood also appeared in the program. Connelly also starred in the films Corky (1972), They Only Kill Their Masters (1972), Benji (1974) and Liar's Moon (1982).

He also released a long-playing record of his singing, titled The Boy from Peyton Place on Phillips Records.

Later career and death
In the 1980s, Connelly made numerous appearances in Italian cult B-movies such as Lucio Fulci's Manhattan Baby, Enzo G. Castellari's 1990: The Bronx Warriors, Ruggero Deodato's The Atlantis Interceptors, and Antonio Margheriti's Jungle Raiders. He also made guest appearances on dozens of television series, such as The Brian Keith Show, the miniseries The Martian Chronicles, Martin Eden, Airwolf, CHiPs, and the television movie Return of the Rebels.

Following a two-year battle with lung cancer, Connelly died at home in December 1988, and was buried at Forest Lawn in Hollywood Hills.

Partial filmography

Move Over, Darling (1963), as Ranking Seaman (uncredited)
What a Way to Go! (1964), as Ned (uncredited)
Gunsmoke (1964)
Peyton Place (1964–1969), as Norman Harrington
Love American Style (1969), segment "Love and Mother", as Paul
Corky (1972), as Billy
They Only Kill Their Masters (1972), as John
Benji (1974), as Henry
The Invasion of Carol Enders (1974), as Adam Reston
Paper Moon (1974), as "Moze" Pray (13 episodes)
Hawmps! (1976), as Uriah Tibbs
Fantasy Island (1978), ep. The funny girl/Butch and Sundance
The Norseman (1978), as Rolf
Crash (1978), as Mike Tagliarino
The Love Boat (1979) S3E12 as Rory Daniels
Earthbound (1981), as Zef
Liar's Moon (1982), as Alex Peterson
Manhattan Baby (1982), as Professor George Hacker
1990: The Bronx Warriors (1982), as Hot Dog
The Atlantis Interceptors (1983), as Mike Ross
Jungle Raiders (1985), as Captain Yankee
Foxtrap (1986), as J.T.
Le miniere del Kilimangiaro (1986), as Professor Thomas Smith / Schmidt
Operation Nam (1986), as Roger Carson
The Messenger  (1986), as FBI Agent Parker
Strike Commando (1987), as Col. Radek
Django 2 (1987), as "El Diablo" Orlowsky
Night of the Sharks (1988), as Father Mattia (final film role)

References

External links

 
 
 

1941 births
1988 deaths
American male television actors
American male film actors
20th-century American male actors
Male actors from Kansas
Deaths from lung cancer in California
Actors from Wichita, Kansas
Burials at Forest Lawn Memorial Park (Hollywood Hills)